As an abbreviation, STCN may refer to:

 Securities Times, a major financial paper in China
 Short-Title Catalogue, Netherlands, a database of the Dutch bibliography up to the year 1800